Geda may refer to:

 Fabio Geda (born 1972), Italian novelist
 Sigitas Geda (1943–2008), Lithuanian author
 GEDA software tools

See also